Andrew Richardson (born 14 March 1974) is a British former professional tennis player, and now a coach.

Career
Richardson competed in the singles draw of a Grand Slam three times, all at Wimbledon and on each occasion as a wildcard. In both 1992 and 1998 he lost in the opening round, to Marc Rosset and Hicham Arazi respectively. However, in the 1997 Wimbledon Championships he reached the third round, with wins over Spanish qualifier Sergi Duran in straight sets and then another Spaniard Juan Albert Viloca, in five sets. He was eliminated by countryman Greg Rusedski in the third round.

He was more successful as a doubles player, winning five tournaments on the ATP Challenger Tour. One of those, at Seoul in 1995, was with Tim Henman as his partner. The pair also reached the semi finals of the 1996 Czech Indoor tournament, an ATP Tour event. Richardson would later be a best man at Henman's wedding.

In 1997, Richardson represented an understrength Great Britain Davis Cup team against Zimbabwe. He defeated Byron Black in a singles match, to level the tie at 1–1 but his second match, against Byron's brother Wayne, which Richardson lost, was a dead-rubber, with Zimbabwe having already secured the tie.

He is now a tennis coach and has worked with British players Ross Hutchins, Miles Kasiri, Alan Mackin and Emma Raducanu. Richardson worked with Raducanu during the 2021 US Open, in which she became the first qualifier to win a grand slam title, and the first British woman to do so since Virginia Wade's Wimbledon title in 1977.

Challenger titles

Singles: (1)

Doubles: (5)

References

External links

1974 births
Living people
English male tennis players
British male tennis players
Sportspeople from Peterborough
Tennis people from Cambridgeshire